Catalina Guillen Feleo-Gervasutti (born 29 December 1985), better known as Ina Feleo, is a Filipino actress, figure skater, dancer, and writer. She rose to fame for playing the main antagonist role as Odessa in romantic-horror-drama on GMA Network, Hanggang Makita Kang Muli.

Biography
Catalina Feleo was born on 29 December 1985, the younger of two daughters of actor Johnny Delgado and director Laurice Guillen after her older sister, Ana. Between the ages of 9 and 16, Feleo trained as a figure skater, originally in the Philippines, but then in USA due to the lack of facilities in the former.
Between 2003 and 2008, she was a member of the Bayanihan Dance Company, touring different countries. 
She graduated from Ateneo de Manila University with a degree in creative writing.

Feleo then moved into films, starting as a dancer, but moving on to speaking roles. By 2007, she had received a "Best Performance of an actress" award at Cinemalaya for her portrayal in the film Endo In 2019, Feleo got engaged to her long term boyfriend and was married on 1 December 2020.

Filmography

Film

Television

References

External links

1986 births
Living people
ABS-CBN personalities
Star Magic
Actresses from Metro Manila
Ateneo de Manila University alumni
Filipino television actresses
GMA Network personalities
Tagalog people